This is a list of the major honours won by football clubs in Indonesia. It lists every Indonesia club to have won any of the domestic trophies recognized as major titles by FIFA.

Honours table

Numbers in bold are Indonesian record totals for that competition.

See also
List of Indonesian football champions
Indonesian football league system
Liga 1
Piala Indonesia
PSSI Community Shield

Notes

References

External links
Indonesia - List of 1931-1943 Perserikatan Champions on RSSSF.com
Indonesia - List of 1951-1993/94 Perserikatan Champions on RSSSF.com
Indonesia - List of Professional Champions on RSSSF.com
Indonesia - List of Cup Finals on RSSSF.com
Indonesia - List of Super Cup Finals on RSSSF.com

 

Perserikatan
Galatama
Indonesian Premier Division
Indonesian Premier League
clubs
Indonesia Super League
Liga 1